Omri Ceren is the national security advisor for U.S. Senator Ted Cruz since April 5, 2018.

He is a former managing director of The Israel Project and political blogger.

He came to international attention when he uncovered that Human Rights Watch military analyst Marc Garlasco was an "avid collector" of Nazi memorabilia and published the information on his blog Mere Rhetoric.

Ceren's blog focuses on the cultural, geopolitical, and economic aspects of the struggle between Western civilization and political Islam.

He received a doctorate in rhetoric at the University of Southern California's Annenberg School for Communication and is a graduate of the University of Pittsburgh.

Ceren has written for The Jewish Journal of Greater Los Angeles, and has contributed op-eds to other publications.

He also drew controversy for criticism of former American President Jimmy Carter's position on the 2006 Israel-Hezbollah conflict in Lebanon  and his defense of Ann Coulter against charges of anti-Semitism.

See also
Criticism of Human Rights Watch

References

External links
 Mere rhetoric blog 

Year of birth missing (living people)
Living people
American bloggers
Jewish American journalists
USC Annenberg School for Communication and Journalism alumni
University of Pittsburgh alumni
21st-century American non-fiction writers
21st-century American Jews